Duosong Township (Mandarin: 多松乡) is a township in Henan Mongol Autonomous County, Huangnan Tibetan Autonomous Prefecture, Qinghai, China. In 2010, Duosong Township had a total population of 2,319: 1,151 males and 1,168 females: 555 aged under 14, 1,645 aged between 15 and 65 and 119 aged over 65.

References 

Township-level divisions of Qinghai
Huangnan Tibetan Autonomous Prefecture